Emil Hristov (born 13 August 1956) is a Bulgarian cinematographer. He contributed to more than fifty films since 1983 including Love.net. Hristov also directed The Colour of the Chameleon.

References

External links 

1956 births
Living people
People from Sofia
Bulgarian filmmakers
Bulgarian cinematographers
National Academy for Theatre and Film Arts alumni